

dh
DHC Plus

di
Di-Atro
Di-Metrex

dia
Diabeta  (Sanofi-Aventis), known also as glyburide
Diabinese, redirects to Chlorpropamide
diacerein (INN)
diacetamate (INN)
diacetolol (INN)
diacetylmorphine known also as diamorphine and heroin and by numerous street names
Dial
diamfenetide (INN)
diamocaine (INN)
diamorphine (INN), known also as diacetylmorphine and heroin and by numerous street names
Diamox
diampromide (INN)
Dianeal
dianicline (INN)
Diapid
diaplasinin (USAN, INN)
diarbarone (INN)
Diasone Sodium
Diastat
diathymosulfone (INN)
diaveridine (INN)
diazepam (INN)
diaziquone (INN)
diazoxide (INN)

dib
dibekacin (INN)
dibemethine (INN)
Dibenil
dibenzepin (INN)
Dibenzyline
dibotermin alfa (USAN)
dibrompropamidine (INN)
dibromsalan (INN)
dibrospidium chloride (INN)
dibuprol (INN)
dibupyrone (INN)
dibusadol (INN)

dic

dica-dicl
dicarbine (INN)
dicarfen (INN)
dichlorisone (INN)
dichlormezanone (INN)
dichlorophen (INN)
dichlorophenarsine (INN)
dichloroxylenol (INN)
dichlorvos (INN)
diciferron (INN)
dicirenone (INN)
diclazuril (INN)
diclofenac (INN)
diclofenamide (INN)
diclofensine (INN)
diclofurime (INN)
Diclohexal (Hexal Australia) [Au]. Redirects to diclofenac.
diclometide (INN)
diclonixin (INN)
dicloralurea (INN)
dicloxacillin (INN)

dico-dicy
dicobalt edetate (INN)
dicolinium iodide (INN)
Dicopac Kit
dicoumarol (INN)
dicresulene (INN)
Dicurin Procaine
dicycloverine (INN)

did-die
didanosine (INN)
Didrex
Didronel
didrovaltrate (INN)
dieldrin (INN)
dienestrol (INN)
dienogest (INN)
diethadione (INN)
diethazine (INN)
diethylcarbamazine (INN)
diethylstilbestrol (INN)
diethylthiambutene (INN)
diethyltoluamide (INN)
dietifen (INN)

dif-dig
difebarbamate (INN)
difemerine (INN)
difemetorex (INN)
difenamizole (INN)
difencloxazine (INN)
difenidol (INN)
difenoximide (INN)
difenoxin (INN)
difetarsone (INN)
difeterol (INN)
Differin
diflorasone (INN)
difloxacin (INN)
difluanazine (INN)
Diflucan
diflucortolone (INN)
diflumidone (INN)
diflunisal (INN)
difluprednate (INN)
diftalone (INN)
digitoxin (INN)
digoxin (INN)

dih-dil
dihexyverine (INN)
dihydralazine (INN)
dihydrocodeine (INN)
dihydroergotamine (INN)
dihydrotachysterol (INN)
diiodohydroxyquinoline (INN)
diisopromine (INN)
Dilacor XR
Dilantin
Dilatrate-SR
Dilaudid
dilazep (INN)
dilevalol (INN)
dilmapimod (USAN, INN)
dilmefone (INN)
Dilor
dilopetine (INN)
diloxanide (INN)
Dilt-CD
Diltahexal (Hexal Australia) [Au]. Redirects to diltiazem.
diltiazem (INN)

dim

dima
dimabefylline (INN)
dimadectin (INN)
dimantine (INN)
dimazole (INN)

dime

dimec-dimes
dimecamine (INN)
dimecolonium iodide (INN)
dimecrotic acid (INN)
dimefadane (INN)
dimefline (INN)
dimelazine (INN)
dimemorfan (INN)
dimenhydrinate (INN)
dimenoxadol (INN)
dimepheptanol (INN)
dimepranol (INN)
dimepregnen (INN)
dimeprozan (INN)
dimercaprol (INN)
dimesna (INN)
dimesone (INN)

dimet-dimev
dimetacrine (INN)
dimetamfetamine (INN)
Dimetane
Dimetapp
dimethadione (INN)
dimethazan (INN)
dimethiodal sodium (INN)
dimethisterone (INN)
dimetholizine (INN)
dimethoxanate (INN)
dimethyl fumarate (USAN)
dimethyl sulfoxide (INN)
dimethylthiambutene (INN)
dimethyltryptamine
dimethyltubocurarinium chloride (INN)
dimetindene (INN)
dimetipirium bromide (INN)
dimetofrine (INN)
dimetotiazine (INN)
dimetridazole (INN)
dimevamide (INN)

dimi-dimp
diminazene (INN)
dimiracetam (INN)
dimoxaprost (INN)
dimoxyline (INN)
dimpylate (INN)

din-dio
dinaciclib (USAN, INN)
dinalin (INN)
dinazafone (INN)
diniprofylline (INN)
dinitolmide (INN)
dinoprost (INN)
dinoprostone (INN)
dinsed (INN)
diodone (INN)
Dionosil Aqueous
diosmin (INN)
Diovan
dioxadilol (INN)
dioxadrol (INN)
dioxamate (INN)
dioxaphetyl butyrate (INN)
dioxation (INN)
dioxethedrin (INN)
dioxifedrine (INN)
dioxybenzone (INN)

dip

dipe-dipo
Dipentum
diperodon (INN)
diphemanil metilsulfate (INN)
Diphen
diphenadione (INN)
diphenan (INN)
diphenhydramine (INN)
diphenoxylate (INN)
Diphenylan Sodium
diphenylpyraline (INN)
diphoxazide (INN)
dipipanone (INN)
dipiproverine (INN)
dipivefrine (INN)
diponium bromide (INN)
dipotassium clorazepate (INN)

dipr-dipy
diprafenone (INN)
dipraglurant (INN)
diprenorphine (INN)
Diprivan
diprobutine (INN)
diprofene (INN)
diprogulic acid (INN)
diproleandomycin (INN)
Diprolene
diprophylline (INN)
diproqualone (INN)
Diprosone
diproteverine (INN)
diproxadol (INN)
dipyridamole (INN)
dipyrithione (INN)
dipyrocetyl (INN)

diq-dis
diquafosol (INN)
dirithromycin (INN)
dirlotapide (USAN)
dirucotide (USAN, INN)
Discase
Disipal
disiquonium chloride (INN)
disitertide (INN)
Disobrom
disobutamide (INN)
Disodium Edetate
disofenin (INN)
disogluside (INN)
Disomer
disomotide (USAN, INN)
Disophrol
disopyramide (INN)
disoxaril (INN)
Dispermox
distigmine bromide (INN)
disufenton sodium (USAN)
disulergine (INN)
disulfamide (INN)
Disulfiram
disulfiram (INN)
disuprazole (INN)

dit-diz
Ditate-DS
ditazole (INN)
ditekiren (INN)
ditercalinium chloride (INN)
dithiazanine iodide (INN)
dithranol (INN)
ditiocade sodium (USAN)
ditiocarb sodium (INN)
ditiomustine (INN)
ditolamide (INN)
ditophal (INN)
Ditropan
Diucardin
Diulo
Diupres
Diuril
Diutensen-R
divabuterol (INN)
divaplon (INN)
dixanthogen (INN)
Dizac
dizatrifone (INN)
dizocilpine (INN)